The GBU-43/B Massive Ordnance Air Blast  (MOAB , colloquially known as the "Mother of All Bombs") is a large-yield bomb, developed for the United States military by Albert L. Weimorts, Jr. of the Air Force Research Laboratory. It was first tested in 2003. At the time of development, it was said to be the most powerful non-nuclear weapon in the American arsenal. The bomb is designed to be delivered by a C-130 Hercules, primarily the MC-130E Combat Talon I or MC-130H Combat Talon II variants.  The bomb's name and nickname were inspired by Iraqi president Saddam Hussein's invocation of the "mother of all battles" (Umm al-Ma'arik) during the 1991 Gulf War.

The MOAB was first deployed in combat in the 13 April 2017 airstrike against an Islamic State – Khorasan Province tunnel complex in Achin District, Afghanistan.

Design and development

The basic principle resembles that of the BLU-82 Daisy Cutter, which was used to clear heavily wooded areas in the Vietnam War. Decades later, the BLU-82 was used in Afghanistan in November 2001 against the Taliban.  Its success as a weapon of intimidation led to the decision to develop the MOAB. Pentagon officials suggested MOAB might be used as an anti-personnel weapon, as part of the "shock and awe" strategy integral to the 2003 invasion of Iraq.

GBU-43s are delivered from C-130 cargo aircraft, inside which they are carried on cradles resting on airdrop platforms. The bombs are dropped by deploying drogue parachutes, which also extract the cradle and platform from the aircraft. Shortly after launch the drogues are released and the bomb falls without the use of a retarding parachute. GPS satellite-guidance is used to guide bombs to their targets.

The MOAB is not a penetrator weapon and is primarily an air burst bomb intended for soft to medium surface targets covering extended areas and targets in a contained environment such as a deep canyon or within a cave system. High altitude carpet-bombing with much smaller  bombs delivered via heavy bombers such as the B-52, B-2, or the B-1 is also highly effective at covering large areas.

The MOAB is designed to be used against a specific target, and cannot by itself replicate the effects of a typical heavy bomber mission. During the Vietnam War's Operation Arc Light program, for example, the United States Air Force sent B-52s on well over 10,000 bombing raids, each usually carried out by two groups of three aircraft. A typical mission dropped 168 tons of ordnance, pounding an area  with an explosive force equivalent to 10 to 17 MOABs.

MOAB was first tested with the explosive tritonal on 11 March 2003, on Range 70 located at Eglin Air Force Base in Florida. It was tested again on 21 November 2003.

Since 2003, 15 MOABs have been manufactured at the McAlester Army Ammunition Plant in McAlester, Oklahoma.

The Air Force has said the MOAB has a unit price of $170,000, but this is a historical unit cost made in the mid-2000s and various factors of the bomb's atypical development process have made exact cost estimation difficult. The Air Force Research Lab generated the value based on already existing parts such as bomb casing and metals, and since the bomb was built in-house, they did not pay for outside research or have standard procurement costs associated with it. MOAB was a "crash project" developed for use against an adversary with uncertain tactics on unfamiliar terrain, and so was an effort to meet an urgent need rather than a formal program. Should more bombs be ordered to be built, manufacturing would likely be started over with higher costs due to a lack of old parts, price inflation, and new design and testing.

Operational use

On 13 April 2017, a MOAB was dropped  on an Islamic State – Khorasan Province (ISKP) cave complex in Achin District, Nangarhar Province, Afghanistan. It was the first operational  use of the bomb. Two days later, an Afghan army spokesman said that the strike killed 94 ISKP militants, including four commanders, with no signs of civilian casualties. However, an Afghan parliamentarian from Nangarhar province, Esmatullah Shinwari, said locals told him the explosion killed a teacher and his young son. Former US military official Marc Garlasco, who served in the George W. Bush administration, said that the US had not previously used the MOAB because of worries that it would inadvertently hurt or kill civilians.

Similar weapons
During World War II, Royal Air Force Bomber Command used the Grand Slam, officially known as the "Bomb, Medium Capacity, 22,000 lb" 42 times. At  total weight, these earthquake bombs were larger and heavier than the MOAB. However, half their weight was due to the cast high tensile steel casing necessary for penetrating the ground – up to  – before exploding. The MOAB, in contrast, has a light  aluminum casing surrounding  of explosive Composition H-6 material.

The United States Air Force's T-12 Cloudmaker  demolition bomb (similar in design to the Grand Slam), developed after World War II, carried a heavier explosive charge than the MOAB, but was never used in combat.

In 2007, the Russian military announced that they had tested a thermobaric weapon nicknamed the "Father of All Bombs" ("FOAB"). The weapon is claimed to be four times as powerful as the MOAB, but its specifications are widely disputed.

The MOAB is the most powerful conventional bomb ever used in combat as measured by the weight of its explosive material. The explosive yield is comparable to that of the smallest tactical nuclear weapons, such as the Cold War-era American M-388 projectile fired by the portable Davy Crockett recoilless gun. At the projectile's lowest yield setting of 10 tons, roughly equivalent to a single MOAB, its explosive force was only 1/144,000th (0.0007%) that of the Air Force's 1.44-megaton W49 warhead, a nuclear weapon commonly found on American ICBMs from the early 1960s.

See also
 Massive Ordnance Penetrator

References

External links

 AFRL GBU-43/B MOAB—Designation Systems
 MOAB - Massive Ordnance Air Blast Bomb—GlobalSecurity.org
 Massive Ordnance Air Blast bomb Test Video
 Five years later, it's still known as 'Mother of all bombs'—af.mil

Articles containing video clips
Guided bombs of the United States
Strategic bombing
War on terror
Afghanistan conflict (1978–present)
Weapons and ammunition introduced in 2003